Sociology of quantification can be defined as the investigation of quantification as a sociological phenomenon in its own right.

Content 
According to a review published in 2018 Sociology of quantification is an expanding fields which includes the literature on the quantified self, that on algorithms, and on various forms of metrics and indicators. Older works which can be classified under the same heading are Theodore Porter’s ‘Trust in numbers’ the, works of French Sociologists Pierre Bourdieu and Alain Desrosières, and the classic works on probability of Ian Hacking and Lorraine Daston. The interest in this field is driven by the increasing importance and scope of quantification, its relation to the economics of conventions,  and by the perception of its dangers as weapons of oppression, or as means to undesirable ends.

For Sally Engle Merry quantification is a technology of control, but whether it is reformist or authoritarian depends on who has harnessed its power and for what purpose. The ‘governance by numbers’ is seen by jurist Alain Supiot as repudiating the goal of governing by just laws, advocating in its stead the attainment of measurable objectives. For Supiot the normative use of economic quantification leaves no option open to countries and economic actors than to ride roughshod over social legislation, and pledge allegiance to stronger powers.

The French movement of ‘Statactivisme’  suggests fighting numbers with numbers under the slogan “a new number is possible". To the opposite extreme, algorithmic-based automation is seen as an instrument of liberation by Aaron Bastani, spurring a debate on digital socialism. An ethics of quantification including algorithms, metrics, statistical and mathematical modelling is suggested in. According to Espeland and Stevens an ethics of quantification would naturally descend from a sociology of quantification, especially at an age where democracy, merit, participation, accountability and even ‘‘fairness’’ are assumed to be best discovered and appreciated via numbers. In  Mennicken and Espeland 2019 provide a review of the main concerns about the "increasing expansion of quantification into all realms, including into people’s personal lives". These authors discuss the new patterns of visibility and obscurity created by quantitative technologies, how these influence relations of power, and how neoliberal regimes of quantification favour 'economization', where "individuals, activities, and organizations are constituted or framed as economic actors and entities." Andrea Mennicken and Robert Salais have curated in 2022 a multi-author volume entitled 'The New Politics of Numbers: Utopia, Evidence and Democracy', with contributions encompassing Foucauldian studies of governmentality - which first flourished in the English-speaking world, and studies of state statistics known as ‘economics of convention’, developed in France, mostly at INSEE.

Mathematical modelling can also be seen as a field of interest for sociology of quantification, and the intensified use of mathematical modelling in relation to the COVID-19 pandemic has spurred a debate on how society uses models. Rhodes and Lancaster speak of 'model as public troubles' and starting from models as boundary objects suggest that a better relation between models and society is needed. The authors in  propose five principles for making models serve society, by moving from the premise that modelling is a social activity.

Links 
 Algorithmic Justice League.
 Cardiff University: “Data Justice Lab”, School of Journalism, Media and Culture.
 French National Research Institute for Sustainable Development: “Project SSSQ - Society for the Social Studies of Quantification.

References

Quantification (science)